Homer C Jones is a census-designated place (CDP) in McKinley County, New Mexico, United States. It was first listed as a CDP prior to the 2020 census.

The community is on the southern edge of the county, bordered to the south by the community of Stoneridge in Cibola County. New Mexico State Road 412 passes through the CDP, leading northeast  to Interstate 40 in Prewitt.

Demographics

Education
It is in Gallup-McKinley County Public Schools.

References 

Census-designated places in McKinley County, New Mexico
Census-designated places in New Mexico